Jagan is a masculine given name in India. There is an Indian film actor and comedian active in Tamil films.

Jagan may also refer to:
 Jagan, Iran (disambiguation), several places in Iran
 Jagan (film), a 1984 Indian film

People with the name 
 Jagan Prasad Garg (born 1952), Indian politician
 Jagan Hames (born 1975), Australian athlete
 Jagan Kumar, Indian motorcycle racer
 Cheddi Jagan (1918–1997), Guyanese politician who served as Premier of British Guiana
 Derek Jagan (1930–2000), Guyanese politician and lawyer who served as Speaker of the National Assembly
 Janet Jagan (1920–2009), the first female President of Guyana
 Joey Jagan, Guyanese dentist and politician
 K. P. Jagan (born 1971), Indian Tamil film actor and director
 Suraj Jagan (born 1967), Indian playback singer of Malayali origin
 Y. S. Jagan Mohan Reddy (born 1972), Indian politician and 17th Chief Minister of Andhra Pradesh

See also 
 Jagannath, a deity worshipped in regional traditions of Hinduism in India and Bangladesh. 
 Jagannath (disambiguation)
 Ramjagan, Indian actor
 Jaghan (disambiguation)
 Yagan (disambiguation)

Telugu names
Hindu given names
Indian given names
Sanskrit-language names
Indian masculine given names
Telugu given names